DEGAS (D.E.G.A.S., Design & Entertainment Graphic Arts System) is a bitmap graphics editor created by Tom Hudson for the Atari ST and published by Batteries Included in 1985. Hudson created some of the sample paintings that shipped with DEGAS.

Development 
The working title of DEGAS was HUDraw,  where "HUD" stood for "Hudson."

Gary Yost of Antic Software wanted to publish DEGAS, but Hudson chose Batteries Included because "they were, in my opinion, the best Atari software company at the time." Yost and Antic Software published Hudson's next program, CAD 3D.

File formats

Legacy 

Antic magazine published winners of an art competition for those using the software in July 1986.

DEGAS was followed in 1986 with DEGAS Elite. It adds multiple work screens, color-cycling animation, and other features.

See also 
 NeoChrome

References

External links 
 DEGAS Elite advertisement

1985 software
Raster graphics editors
Atari ST software